The Bright Angel Point Trail is a hiking trail located on the North Rim of the Grand Canyon National Park, located in the U.S. state of Arizona.

Description
The Bright Angel Point Trail begins on the south side of the Grand Canyon Lodge complex, at the southern terminus of the Transept Trail, on the North Rim of the Grand Canyon. 

The trail is paved over its entire  length.  This easy trail follows a ridge line at the end of the Bright Angel Peninsula to Bright Angel Point, which offers a panoramic view of the canyon from its north side.

There is no water available on trail.

Hikers and tourists should stay off the trail when thunderstorms are in the area. Exposed points along the rim attract lightning.

See also
 The Grand Canyon
 List of trails in Grand Canyon National Park

References

External links
 Official  Grand Canyon National Park website

Grand Canyon, North Rim
Hiking trails in Grand Canyon National Park